Nootropics is the second album released by Baltimore indie rock band Lower Dens. It was released April 30, 2012, on the Domino Recording Company’s Ribbon Music label, the band’s first album on that label, its debut Twin-Hand Movement being released on Gnomonsong.

Nootropics was recorded at the Key Club Recording Company in Benton Harbor, Michigan. It was produced by Drew Brown, an engineer who had assisted Nigel Godrich on several projects.

The second track “Brains” was released as a single ahead of the album, and highlighted that week by Stereogum.

Track listing 
 “Alphabet Song” - 5:28
 "Brains" - 5:07
 "Stem" - 2:06
 "Propagation"-  4:59
 "Lamb" - 3:43
 "Candy" - 3:20
 "Lion in Winter, Pt. 1" - 4:16
 "Lion in Winter, Pt. 2" - 3:36
 "Nova Anthem" - 5:28
 "In the End Is the Beginning" - 12:18

Personnel 
 Will Adams – Guitar
 Geoff Graham – Bass, vocals
 Jana Hunter – Vocals, guitar, synths
 Nate Nelson – Drums
 Carter Tanton – Synths, guitar, vocals

The album was produced, engineered, and mixed by Drew Brown, with additional engineering by Bill Skibbe and Jessica Ruffins. “Lamb” was engineered and mixed by Claudius Mittendorfer. Album artwork and design was done by Rose Chase with photographs by Jana Hunter and Sean Donnola.

References

2012 albums
Lower Dens albums